Ahimsa is a 1981 Malayalam-language political film directed by I. V. Sasi and written by T. Damodaran, starring  Sukumaran, Mammootty, Ratheesh, Poornima Jayaram, Seema, Balan K. Nair, Mohanlal and Menaka in other supporting roles. The film won Kerala State Film Award for Second Best Actor (Mammootty) and Best Editor (Narayanan).

Plot
Talks about the Hindu-Muslim politics and conflicts in Kerala which connects with triggered by some of the feudal lords. The movie urges the audience with the importance of non-violence.

Cast
Sukumaran as Devan
Mammootty as Vasu
Ratheesh as Bharathan
Poornima Jayaram as Suma
Menaka as Safiya
Mohanlal as Mohan
Lalu Alex as Raghu
Jose Prakash as R. K.
Balan K. Nair as Kunjutty
Seema as Ani
Jose as Suresh
Kuthiravattom Pappu as  Muthu
Achankunju as Kuttayi
Sukumari as Bharathan's Mother
Prathapachandran as Govindan
Sathaar as Bichu
P. K. Abraham
T. G. Ravi as Peter
Sreenivasan as Raju
Swapna as Radha
K.P.A.C. Sunny as Pappan
Kunjandi as Musliar
Kothuku Nanappan as Sankaran
Kunchan as Dasan
Vilasini as Lakshmi
Rajalakshmi
K. T. C. Abdullah as Avukkar (Hajiyar's assistant)
 Baskara Kurup as Hajiyar
 Rajan Padoor

Box office
The film was commercial success.

Soundtrack

The soundtrack features four songs, all written by Bichu Thirumala and composed by A. T. Ummer.

References

External links
 

1981 films
1980s Malayalam-language films
Films about religious violence in India
Films shot in Kerala
Films with screenplays by T. Damodaran
Films directed by I. V. Sasi
Films scored by A. T. Ummer